The Toroslar Bocce Facility is a 16-court indoor sports venue for bocce events at Toroslar district in Mersin, Turkey. Built for use by the 2013 Mediterranean Games and opened in 2013, it is owned by the Youth Services and Sports Directoriate of Mersin having a seating capacity of 1,000.

The facility is home to Toroslar Belediyespor bocce team. Bocce competitions of the 2013 Mediterranean Games were hosted in the venue on June 25–29.

References

Indoor arenas in Turkey
Sports venues in Mersin
Toroslar District
Sports venues completed in 2013
2013 Mediterranean Games venues